Two merchant ships have been named SS John B. Cowle.
 , U.S. propeller, steamer, bulk freighter, Official No. 77559 .  Sank in 1909 in Whitefish Bay in a collision with steamer Isaac M. Scott.
  SS John B. Cowle (1910), U.S. propeller, steamer, bulk freighter, Official No. 207277. Renamed Harry L. Allen 1969–1978.  Scrapped 1978.

References

Ship names